Idolos de Juventud (Youth Idols) was a Spanish-language telenovela produced by the United States-based television network Telemundo.  
This limited-run series about a fictional pop-music reality show in Mexico it was set to debuts during the summer of 2008, airing weekdays from 7-8 p.m. the plan was to air it in the US with only a single 30-second  commercial per episode—and instead feature pervasive product placement woven into each episode.

Telemundo was expected to air 40 episodes of this short-form novela on weeknights over about eight weeks.  As with most of its other soap operas, the network was set to broadcast English subtitles as closed captions on CC3. Aurelio Valcárcel Carroll was the executive producer and the cast includes Karla Díaz-Leal, Marcela Garcia, Patricia Sirvent, Eduardo Cuervo and Jencarlos Canela. The show is shot at Telemundo Studios, Miami.

Story
This summary is based on Telemundo's May upfront presentation.  Storylines may change dramatically by the time this series airs.

The series features Ramón Armendariz, a handsome pop music producer who launches the careers of Mexico’s hottest singers, including that of his beautiful wife Gloria. Their combined egos wreck their relationship, however, making their marriage unhappy.  As his wife's star is falling, he devises a spectacular American Idol-style reality show to find a new singing sensation.

He discovers two vivacious, passionate stars who fall madly in love on stage.  Valentín is a handsome, yet determined young man from humble roots who never needs an excuse to sing. Victoria is an adorable young singer whose beauty matches her voice.

Destiny unites these two stars, but their passion faces a major test.  Gloria demands Valentín’s attention, leading him to a new life that spins out of control.  Love must survive the trials of fame.

Product placement
Telemundo will air several seven packages of product placements instead of regular commercials.  Only one 30-second spot will appear during each episodes, either near the very beginning or end of the show.  It will use three types of product insertion, each more expensive than the other:

Passive integration is when a product simply appears on-camera during a scene.
Active integration refers to a scene where a character interacts with a product.
Storyline integration refers to a product becoming part of the show's plot.

Telemundo wants to retain viewers who might ordinarily tune away or fast-forward during commercial breaks.  Network executives plan to sign deals for all seven packages by early next year, then the show's writers will write scripts that integrate the sponsor's products.  They also say Idolos will still be a quality show—and that the ads will be subtle enough that the serial is watchable.

Cast
Héctor Soberón
 Karla Díaz-Leal
 Marcela Garcia
 Eduardo Cuervo 
 Jencarlos Canela
 Patricia Sirvent

Cancellation

The production released a teaser displaying the characters and the reality show in it known as "Idolos de Juventud" since Karla Diaz, Marcela Garcia and Patricia Sirvent were a musical group called Jeans in her current life, the commitment made by them as a musical group made difficult the chances to start the recording of this telenovela. Beside there is a rumour that Alejandro Sirvent (Patricia's father) didn't want his daughter to play the villain since she was going to pursuit a solo career in the music and this could damage her "nice and innocent" image.

Footnotes

External links
 Telemundo English publicity site with teaser trailer

Unaired television pilots
Telemundo telenovelas